The Sintashta culture, around 2050–1900 BCE, is the first phase of the Sintashta–Petrovka culture or Sintashta–Arkaim culture, and is a late Middle Bronze Age archaeological culture, located to the east of the Southern Urals, within the northern Eurasian steppe on the borders of Eastern Europe and Central Asia. The whole Sintashta–Petrovka complex was dated in a recent publication by Stephan Lindner, based on a series of 19 calibrated radiocarbon dating samples as belonging to c. 2050–1750 BCE. The phase of the Petrovka culture can be dated c. 1900–1750 BCE.  The oldest reliable analysis of human remains from Sintashta is radiocarbon dated to a mean of  cal BC (2335–2041 calBC), and genetically analyzed as Y-haplogroup R1a-Z93 < R-Z2124.

The Sintashta culture was previously dated to the period 2200–1800 BCE.  In 2020 Ventresca Miller et al. still claimed a period of 2400–1800 BCE, based on 44 earlier C14 calibrated datings by the Russian Academy of Sciences, which some other researchers consider outdated. The culture is named after the Sintashta archaeological site, in Chelyabinsk Oblast, Russia, and spreads through Orenburg Oblast, Bashkortostan, and Northern Kazakhstan.

This culture is thought to represent an eastward migration of peoples from the Corded Ware culture. It is widely regarded as the origin of the Indo-Iranian languages. The earliest known chariots have been found in Sintashta burials, and the culture is considered a strong candidate for the origin of the technology, which spread throughout the Old World and played an important role in ancient warfare. Sintashta settlements are also remarkable for the intensity of copper mining and bronze metallurgy carried out there, which is unusual for a steppe culture. Among the main features of the Sintashta culture are high levels of militarism and extensive fortified settlements, of which 23 are known.

Origin

According to Russian archaeologists, the Sintashta culture emerged from the interaction of two antecedent cultures, the Poltavka culture and the Abashevo culture. Because of the difficulty of identifying the remains of Sintashta sites beneath those of later settlements, the culture was only distinguished in the 1990s from the Andronovo culture. It was then recognised as a distinct entity, forming part of the "Andronovo horizon". Results from a genetic study published in Nature in 2015 suggested that the Sintashta culture emerged as a result of an eastward migration of peoples from the Corded Ware culture.

Morphological data suggests that the Sintashta culture might have emerged as a result of a mixture of steppe ancestry from the Poltavka culture and Catacomb culture, with ancestry from Neolithic forest hunter-gatherers.

Even though other researchers think it's an outdated chronology, Ventresca Miller et al. still claim that the first Sintashta settlements appeared around 2400 BCE and lasted until 1800 BCE with population estimates in each site ranging from 200 to 700 individuals, during a period of climatic change that saw the already arid Kazakh steppe region become even colder and drier. The marshy lowlands around the Ural and upper Tobol rivers, previously favoured as winter refuges, became increasingly important for survival. Under these pressures both Poltavka and Abashevo herders settled permanently in river valley strongholds, eschewing more defensible hill-top locations. Ventresca Miller et al. also claims that "by 2300 cal BCE, Middle Bronze Age sites associated with Sintashta and Petrovka cultural groups in northern Kazakhstan heavily exploited domesticated cattle, sheep, and goats alongside horses with occasional hunting of wild fauna".

Its immediate predecessor in the Ural-Tobol steppe was the Poltavka culture, an offshoot of the cattle-herding Yamnaya horizon that moved east into the region between 2800 and 2600 BCE. Several Sintashta towns were built over older Poltavka settlements or close to Poltavka cemeteries, and Poltavka motifs are common on Sintashta pottery.

Sintashta material culture also shows the influence of the late Abashevo culture, derived from the Fatyanovo-Balanovo culture, a collection of Corded Ware settlements in the forest steppe zone north of the Sintashta region that were also predominantly pastoralist.

Society

Linguistic identity

The people of the Sintashta culture are thought to have spoken Proto-Indo-Iranian, the ancestor of the Indo-Iranian language family. This identification is based primarily on similarities between sections of the Rig Veda, a religious text which includes ancient Indo-Iranian hymns recorded in Vedic Sanskrit, and the funerary rituals of the Sintashta culture as revealed by archaeology. Many cultural similarities with Sintashta have also been detected in the Nordic Bronze Age of Scandinavia.

There is linguistic evidence of interaction between Finno-Ugric and Indo-Iranian languages, showing influences from the Indo-Iranians into the Finno-Ugric culture.

From the Sintashta culture the Indo-Iranian followed the migrations of the Indo-Iranians to Anatolia, India and Iran. From the 9th century BCE onward, Iranian languages also migrated westward with the Scythians back to the Pontic steppe where the proto-Indo-Europeans came from.

Warfare

The preceding Abashevo culture was already marked by endemic intertribal warfare; intensified by ecological stress and competition for resources in the Sintashta period. This drove the construction of fortifications on an unprecedented scale and innovations in military technique such as the invention of the war chariot. Increased competition between tribal groups may also explain the extravagant sacrifices seen in Sintashta burials, as rivals sought to outdo one another in acts of conspicuous consumption analogous to the North American potlatch tradition.

Sintashta artefact types such as spearheads, trilobed arrowheads, chisels, and large shaft-hole axes were taken east. Many Sintashta graves are furnished with weapons, although the composite bow associated later with chariotry does not appear. Higher-status grave goods include their infamous chariots, as well as axes, mace-heads, spearheads, and cheek-pieces. Sintashta sites have produced finds of horn and bone, interpreted as furniture (grips, arrow rests, bow ends, string loops) of bows; there is no indication that the bending parts of these bows included anything other than wood. Arrowheads are also found, made of stone or bone rather than metal. These arrows are short, 50–70 cm long, and the bows themselves may have been correspondingly short.

Sintashta culture, and the chariot, are also strongly associated with the ancestors of modern domestic horses, the DOM2 population. DOM2 horses originated from the Western Eurasia steppes, especially the lower Volga-Don, but not in Anatolia, during the late fourth and early third millennia BCE. Their genes may show selection for easier domestication and stronger backs.

Metal production

The Sintashta economy came to revolve around copper metallurgy. Copper ores from nearby mines (such as Vorovskaya Yama) were taken to Sintashta settlements to be processed into copper and arsenical bronze. This occurred on an industrial scale: all the excavated buildings at the Sintashta sites of Sintashta, Arkaim and Ust'e contained the remains of smelting ovens and slag. Around 10% of graves, mostly adult male, contained artifacts related to bronze metallurgy (molds, ceramic nozzles, ore and slag remains, metal bars and drops). However, these metal-production related grave goods rarely co-occur with higher-status grave goods. This likely means that those who engaged in metal production were not at the top of the social-hierarchy, even though being buried at a cemetery evidences some sort of higher status.

Much of Sintashta metal was destined for export to the cities of the Bactria–Margiana Archaeological Complex (BMAC) in Central Asia. The metal trade between Sintashta and the BMAC for the first time connected the steppe region to the ancient urban civilisations of the Near East: the empires and city-states of modern Iran and Mesopotamia provided an large market for metals. These trade routes later became the vehicle through which horses, chariots and ultimately Indo-Iranian-speaking people entered the Near East from the steppe.

Gallery

Physical type
Physical remains of the Sintashta people have revealed that they were Caucasoid with dolichocephalic skulls. Sintashta skulls are very similar to those of the preceding Fatyanovo–Balanovo culture and Abashevo culture, which ultimately trace their origin to Central Europe, and those of the succeeding Srubnaya culture and Andronovo culture. Skulls of the related Potapovka culture are less dolichocephalic, possibly as a result of admixture between Sintashta people and descendants of the Yamnaya culture and Poltavka culture, who although of a similar Europoid type, were less dolichocephalic than Sintashta. The physical type of Abashevo, Sintashta, Andronovo and Srubnaya is later observed among the Scythians.

Genetics

 analyzed the remains of four individuals ascribed to the Sintastha culture. One male carried Y-haplogroup R1a and mt-J1c1b1a, while the other carried Y-R1a1a1b and mt-J2b1a2a. The two females carried U2e1e and U2e1h respectively. The study found a close autosomal genetic relationship between peoples of Corded Ware culture and Sintashta culture, which "suggests similar genetic sources of the two," and may imply that "the Sintashta derives directly from an eastward migration of Corded Ware peoples." Sintashta individuals and Corded Ware individuals both had a relatively higher ancestry proportion derived from the Central Europe, and both differed markedly in such ancestry from the population of the Yamnaya Culture and most individuals of the Poltavka Culture that preceded Sintashta in the same geographic region. The Bell Beaker culture, the Unetice culture and contemporary Scandinavian cultures were also found to be closely genetically related to Corded Ware. A particularly high lactose tolerance was found among Corded Ware and the closely related Nordic Bronze Age. In addition, the study found the Sintashta culture to be closely genetically related to the succeeding Andronovo culture.

 analyzed the remains of several members of the Sintashta culture. mtDNA was extracted from two females buried at the Petrovka settlement. They were found to be carrying subclades of U2 and U5. The remains of fifty individuals from the fortified Sintastha settlement of Kamennyi Ambar was analyzed. This was the largest sample of ancient DNA ever sampled from a single site. The Y-DNA from thirty males was extracted. Eighteen carried R1a and various subclades of it (particularly subclades of R1a1a1), five carried subclades of R1b (particularly subclades of R1b1a1a), two carried Q1a and a subclade of it, one carried I2a1a1a, and four carried unspecified R1 clades. The majority of mtDNA samples belonged to various subclades of U, while W, J, T, H and K also occurred. A Sintashta male buried at Samara was found to be carrying R1b1a1a2 and J1c1b1a. The authors of the study found the Sintashta people to be closely genetically related to the people of the Corded Ware culture, the Srubnaya culture, the Potapovka culture, and the Andronovo culture. These were found to harbor mixed ancestry from the Yamnaya culture and peoples of the Central European Middle Neolithic, like the Globular Amphora culture. Sintashta people were deemed "genetically almost indistinguishable" from samples taken from the northwestern areas constituting the core of the Andronovo culture, which were "genetically largely homogeneous". The genetic data suggested that the Sintashta culture was ultimately derived of a remigration of Central European peoples with steppe ancestry back into the steppe. Some Sintastha individuals displayed similarities with earlier samples collected at Khvalynsk.

Horse genetics

The dispersal of the DOM2 genetic lineage, believed to be the ancestor of all modern domesticated horses, is linked with the populations which preceded the Sintashta culture and their expansions. A genetic study published in 2021 suggests that these horses were selectively bred for desired traits including docility, stress tolerance, endurance running, and higher weight-carrying thresholds.

See also

 Sintashta
 Arkaim
 Petrovka settlement
Country of Towns
 Cimmerians
 Karasuk culture
 Scytho-Siberian world
 Indo-Iranians
 Vedic period

Notes

References

Further reading
Vasil'ev, I. B., P. F. Kuznetsov, and A. P. Semenova. "Potapovo Burial Ground of the Indo-Iranic Tribes on the Volga" (1994).

Sources

External links
 Stanislav A. Grigoriev, "Ancient Indo-Europeans" 

Archaeological cultures of Central Asia
Indo-Iranian archaeological cultures
Andronovo culture